Peyrieras's woolly lemur or Peyrieras's avahi (Avahi peyrierasi) is a species of woolly lemur native to southeastern Madagascar.  It weighs about 1 kg.

References

Woolly lemurs
Mammals described in 2006